Empress Xiaoyichun (23 October 1727 – 28 February 1775), of the Manchu Bordered Yellow Banner Weigiya clan, was a consort of the Qianlong Emperor. She was 16 years his junior. Her eldest surviving son became the Jiaqing Emperor.

Life

Family background
Empress Xiaoyichun's personal name was not recorded in history. She was a Han Chinese Booi Aha of the Bordered Yellow Banner by birth.

 Father: Qingtai; served as a fifth rank literary official in the Imperial Household Department, and held the title of a third class duke
 Paternal grandfather: Jiuling
 Mother: Lady Yanggiya
 Two brothers

Yongzheng era
Lady Wei was born on the ninth day of the ninth lunar month in the fifth year of the reign of the Yongzheng Emperor, which translates to 23 October 1727 in the Gregorian calendar.

Qianlong era
It is not known when Lady Wei entered the Forbidden City as a maid. In 1745, she was granted the title "Noble Lady". She was elevated on 9 December 1745 to "Concubine Ling", with "Ling" meaning "clever and pleasant". On 20 May 1749 she was promoted to "Consort Ling", and although at this point she still had no children, the Qianlong Emperor adored her, describing her as gentle and beautiful. On 10 August 1756, when she was twenty-nine years old, she gave birth to the emperor's seventh daughter, Princess Hejing. One year later, on 31 August 1757, she gave birth to the 14th son, Yonglu, who would die prematurely on 3 May 1760, and on 17 August 1758 to the ninth daughter, Princess Heke. On 3 February 1760, Consort Ling was elevated to "Noble Consort Ling". On 13 November 1760, she gave birth to the emperor's 15th son, Yongyan, and on 13 January 1763 to his 16th son, who would die prematurely on 6 May 1765.

In 1765, while on a tour to Hangzhou, Empress Nara fell out of favor and was send back to the Forbidden City to be confined. The real reason behind the empress' downfall remains the subject of debate. Whatever happened, when they returned to the Forbidden City the emperor stripped the empress of her powers and on 28 July he promoted Noble Consort Ling to "Imperial Noble Consort". On 17 June 1766, she gave birth to the 17th son, Yonglin.

Empress Nara died on 19 August 1766 and the emperor did not designate a new empress. However, the Imperial Noble Consort, who held the highest rank among all of the consorts, was placed in charge of the imperial harem. Like her master, she was thrifty in managing the palace funds and guided the Confucian rituals. She also accompanied the Qianlong Emperor on his excursions to Mount Tai, Jehol and the areas south of the Yangtze River.

In the thirty-eight year of his reign, the emperor decided to secretly select an heir. Seven of his sons were living at the time, but he decided to choose Yongyan, who was not outstanding, but was hardworking and humble.

As time passed, the Imperial Noble Consort became increasingly ill. On 9 February 1775 her elder daughter Princess Hejing died, and the unfortunate news worsened her condition. She succumbed to her illness on 28 February 1775 at the age of 47. On 12 March 1775, she was posthumously granted the title "Imperial Noble Consort Lingyi", and on 19 November, she was interred in the Yu Mausoleum of the Eastern Qing tombs after a grand funeral far more regal than that of an Imperial Noble Consort. She was buried on the right side of the emperor's burial place, while his first wife, Empress Xiaoxianchun, was buried on the left side. After the Yu Mausoleum grave robbery occurred in 1928, it was revealed that her remains were well-preserved during inspection.

Jiaqing era
On 9 February 1796, the Qianlong Emperor abdicated and became a retired emperor. At the same time, the Qianlong Emperor announced his successor. Yongyan was enthroned as the Jiaqing Emperor.  Her son Jiaqing Emperor posthumously elevated Imperial Noble Consort Lingyi to "Empress Xiaoyi". After the Qianlong Emperor died on 7 February 1799, the Jiaqing Emperor honoured his mother with the posthumous title "Empress Xiaoyichun".

Titles
 During the reign of the Yongzheng Emperor (r. 1722–1735):
 Lady Wei (from 1727)

 During the reign of the Qianlong Emperor (r. 1735–1796):
 Noble Lady (from 1745), sixth rank consort
 Concubine Ling (from 9 December 1745), fifth rank consort
 Consort Ling (from 20 May 1749), fourth rank consort
 Noble Consort Ling (from 3 February 1760), third rank consort
 Imperial Noble Consort  (from 28 July 1765), second rank consort
 Imperial Noble Consort Lingyi (from 12 March 1775)
 During the reign of the Jiaqing Emperor (r. 1796–1820):
 Empress Xiaoyi (from 15 October 1796)
 Empress Xiaoyichun (from 1799)

Issue
 As Consort Ling:
 Princess Hejing of the First Rank (10 August 1756 – 9 February 1775), the Qianlong Emperor's seventh daughter
 Married Lhawang Dorji (1754–1816), of the Khalkha Borjigit clan in August/September 1770
 Yonglu (31 August 1757 – 3 May 1760), the Qianlong Emperor's 14th son
 Princess Heke of the Second Rank (17 August 1758 – 14 December 1780), the Qianlong Emperor's nith daughter
 Married Jalantai (d. 1788), of the Manchu Uya clan in August/September 1772
 Miscarriage at eight months (13 November 1759)
 As Noble Consort Ling:
 Yongyan (13 November 1760 – 2 September 1820), the Qianlong Emperor's 15th son, enthroned on 9 February 1796 as the Jiaqing Emperor
 16th son (13 January 1763 – 6 May 1765)
 As Imperial Noble Consort:
 Yonglin (17 June 1766 – 25 April 1820), Prince Qingxi of the First Rank, the Qianlong Emperor's 17th son

Gallery

In fiction and popular culture
 Portrayed by Chan Tik-wah in The Rise and Fall of Qing Dynasty (1988)
 Portrayed by Zhao Lijuan in My Fair Princess (1998)
 Portrayed by Chen Li in My Fair Princess III (2003)
 Portrayed by Sharon Chan in Word Twisters' Adventures (2007)
 Portrayed by Liu Xiaoye in New My Fair Princess (2011)
 Portrayed by Wu Jinyan in Story of Yanxi Palace (2018) and Yanxi Palace: Princess Adventures (2019)
 Portrayed by Li Chun in Ruyi's Royal Love in the Palace (2018)

See also
 Imperial Chinese harem system#Qing
 Royal and noble ranks of the Qing dynasty

Notes

References
 
 
 

1727 births
1775 deaths
Qing dynasty posthumous empresses
18th-century Chinese women
18th-century Chinese people
Consorts of the Qianlong Emperor